Sophie Hasenclever (6 January 1823 as Sophie von Schadow – 10 May 1892) was a German poet and translator.

Life 
Sophie von Schadow was born in Berlin, the only daughter of Wilhelm von Schadow and his wife Charlotte von Groschke, who came from Kurland. Her father was a professor at the Prussian Academy of Arts at the time of her birth and became director of the Kunstakademie Düsseldorf in 1826. Sophie von Schadow grew up in the Düsseldorf artistic milieu. In her parents' house at Flinger Steinweg (today  Schadowstraße) 54, the painters of the Düsseldorf school of painting, writers and composers socialised, including Felix Mendelssohn Bartholdy, who lived in the neighbourhood for several years. Von Schadow, who painted his daughter's portrait several times, gave her painting lessons in person. At the age of six, Sophie travelled to Italy with her parents for the first time, and ten years later, for the second time in Rome, she learned the Italian language.

Richard Hasenclever was variously active artistically, as a writer and politically, and later became a co-founder of the Old Catholic movement and a member of the Reichstag. The couple had two children, Anna (b. 1846) and Felix (1851–1892). Their son later joined the navy and became a corvette captain and naval attaché. Their daughter Anna married the merchant Eduard Paniel (1849-1907) in 1877. For the two decades after the birth of her children, Sophie Hasenclever did not appear in public as a poet, but devoted herself to family life, which corresponded to the social expectations of married women. In fact, Sophie Hasenclever worked on her own poetry and translations even during the family phase. 

In Düsseldorf, they lived at Hofgartenstraße 8 until the early 1860s, also the death house of their father in 1862. Later, they had a house at Goltsteinstraße 24. Direct neighbours at the end of the 19th century were the family of the painter Karl Rudolf Sohn and the Else Sohn-Rethel. The older sculptor  lived in the Hasenclevers' house and around 1880 the painter Hermann Schmiechen. Here she and her husband ran a künstlerisch-literarischen Salon where many greats of the time came and went, among them the poet Karl Immermann and Gottfried Keller, as well as the composers Ferdinand Hiller, Robert Schumann and the composer and pianist Clara Schumann. The painter Carl Gehrts found social connections in the circle of the writer Hasenclever.

In 1873, her husband, together with like-minded people, founded the Old Catholic Association, from which the Old Catholic Church congregation in Düsseldorf emerged. Sophie Hasenclever joined, "following her conscience, out of full conviction" - said Pastor Wilhelm Schirmer at her funeral. 

In 1892, Hasenclever died in Düsseldorf at the age of 68, leaving behind a wealth of unpublished manuscripts.

Work 
Among Hasenclever's works are various poems critical of civilisation, and her novellas are often about man who must prove himself in a crisis situation. Many of her poems, fairy tales, comedies and satires have remained unpublished. In part, she wrote under the pseudonym S. Rolant including the historical novel Geisterschlacht. Hasenclever also made a name for herself as a translator. She mastered not only the Italian but also the French language. Over the years, she produced translations with her own introductions, in which she classified the respective work in terms of literary history. 

From the 1870s onwards, Sophie Hasenclever published, among others, the novelette, Aus der Kriegszeit 1870-71 (From the War of 1870-71) and the poetry collection Rheinische Lieder (Rhenish Songs), which were widely acclaimed. The literary historian Heinrich Groß attested Sophie Hasenclever with this collection "a lasting place in German literature". In 1874, her translation of the poems of the Breton poet Auguste Brizeux appeared. In 1875, on the occasion of the 400th anniversary of Michelangelo's birth, she presented a translation of his entire poetic oeuvre, which she had worked on for a full decade and which is still not outdated today. 

In addition to nature hymns and poems critical of civilisation, in which she warned against advancing industrialisation, there were variations on love, loneliness and death. In the two-volume edition of her Novellen und Märchen published in 1884, which she dedicated to the Swiss writer Gottfried Keller, she thematised above all crisis and conflict situations in which people have to prove themselves.

She wrote the text for Mendelssohn-Bartholdy's Athalia, which was performed privately at the court of Karl Anton, Prince of Hohenzollern, who resided in Düsseldorf at the time. The composer Ferdinand Hiller added to his cantata for solos, choir and orchestra  is based on Hasenclever's adaptation of this Indian story. The story is about King Nala, who loses his kingdom through a passion for gambling and finally regains it, and about his faithful wife Damayanti. In preparation, Hasenclever had studied ancient Indian literature for years. In 1890 her translation of Dante's Divine Comedy.

Work 
 A. Briseux, Gedichte, translations, 1874
 Aus der Kriegszeit von 1870 bis 1871, Novellas, 1877
 Rheinische Lieder, poems, 1881
 Novellen und Märchen, 2 volumes, 1884
 Dantes Göttliche Komödie, translation 1889, hardcover edition, Felix Bagel, 1915
 Michelangelos Gedichte. Sämmtliche Gedichte Michelangelo's in Guasti's Text, mit deutscher Uebersetzung von Sophie Hasenclever, eingeführt durch M. Jordan. Dürr, Leipzig, 1875
 Michelangelo, Poesie album (Lyrikreihe), 1973

References

Further reading 
 Adolph Kohut: Die Tochter Wilhelm von Schadow's. In Adolf Kohut: Aus meiner rheinischen Studienmappe. Charakterbilder, Literaturporträts und Skizzen aus der Gegenwart. Breidenbach & Baumann, Düsseldorf 1877, pp. 83 ff. (Numerized).

External links 

 Sophie Hasenclever, Quelle: Dem Vergessen entgegen. Frauen in der Geistesgeschichte Düsseldorfs. Lebensbilder und Chroniken. Dokumentation einer Ausstellung des Frauen-Kultur-Archivs. Neuss 1989
 Sophie Hasenclever, at schadow-gesellschaft.org, retrieved 14 September 2021
 Maria Carolina Sophia von Schadow, at geneanet.org

19th-century German writers
19th-century German poets
French–German translators
Italian–German translators
1823 births
1892 deaths
Writers from Berlin